Tesa may refer to:

 Tesa SA, a Swiss company manufacturing precision measurement products
 Tesa SE, a German company manufacturing adhesive products